Azul River may refer to:

 Azul River (Argentina)
 Blue Creek (Belize) or Azul River, in Mexico
 Río Azul District, a district of La Unión canton, Cartago province, Costa Rica

Brazil
 Azul River (Acre)
 Azul River (Ivaí River tributary)
 Azul River (Mato Grosso)
 Azul River (Piquiri River tributary)
 Azul River (Rio Grande do Sul)

See also
 Agua Azul river,  Chiapas and Tabasco, Mexico
 Acul River, a river of Haiti